Wayne Ashley Mason  (born 1949) is a New Zealand musician.

Biography
Mason was born in New Plymouth in 1949. He was a founding member of 1960s pop group The Fourmyula and later formed Rockinghorse and The Warratahs before embarking on a solo career in 1994.

Mason wrote a series of hit singles with Ali Richardson for The Fourmyula; his best known song is "Nature", which in 2001 was voted No.1 in a list of the Top 100 New Zealand Songs of All Time.  The song, which Mason re-recorded on his 2001 album Same Boy, has also been covered by The Mutton Birds and Margaret Urlich.

In the 2002 Queen's Birthday and Golden Jubilee Honours, Mason was appointed a Member of the New Zealand Order of Merit, for services to music.

Solo discography

Albums

Awards

Aotearoa Music Awards
The Aotearoa Music Awards (previously known as New Zealand Music Awards (NZMA)) are an annual awards night celebrating excellence in New Zealand music and have been presented annually since 1965.

! 
|-
| 2010 || Wayne Mason (as part of The Fourmyula) || New Zealand Music Hall of Fame ||  || 
|-

References

Further reading 
 Dix, John, Stranded in Paradise, Penguin, 2005. 
 Eggleton, David, Ready To Fly, Craig Potton, 2003. 
 Spittle, Gordon, Counting The Beat, GP Publications, 1997.

External links 
Wayne Mason at AudioCulture

1949 births
Living people
APRA Award winners
Members of the New Zealand Order of Merit
New Zealand musicians
People from New Plymouth
People educated at Heretaunga College